Inquisitor latiriformis is a species of sea snail, a marine gastropod mollusk in the family Pseudomelatomidae, the turrids.

Description
The length of the shell varies between 12 mm and 18 mm.

Distribution
This marine species occurs off Zululand, South Africa.

References

 Kilburn, R.N., 1988. Turridae (Mollusca: Gastropoda) of southern Africa and Mozambique. Part 4. Subfamilies Drilliinae, Crassispirinae and Strictispirinae. Annals of the Natal Museum 29(1): 167-320

External links
 
 

Endemic fauna of South Africa
latiriformis
Gastropods described in 1988